Sunset Sundown is an album by the country rock group The Burrito Brothers, released in 1982.

After Skip Battin left the band before Hearts on the Line, the remaining three members of the Burrito Brothers carried on hoping to keep their commercial success going. The three singles released from this album, "If Something Should Come Between Us (Let It Be Love)", "Closer to You" and "I'm Drinkin' Canada Dry", all made the US country top 40. After the recording of Sunset Sundown, sole founding member "Sneaky" Pete Kleinow left the band, leaving the Burrito Brothers as a duo of John Beland and Gib Guilbeau.

In 1983, the pair would go on to a few more hit singles and record one more album for Curb Records, A Taste of the Country. While the album remains unreleased, "Blue and Broken-Hearted Me" and "Could You Love Me One More Time" would show more chart success for the duo. In 1984, after leaving Curb Records, the duo recorded a double LP for Paradise Records entitled A New Shade of Blue featuring background vocals by the Jordanaires.  Paradise Records folded before the album could be released, however a 13-track version of it was released in Europe in 1995 as Double Barrel. After the sessions for the album, Beland and Guilbeau went their separate ways, bringing the Flying Burrito Brothers to an end again, albeit temporarily.

Track listing
All tracks composed and arranged by John Beland and Gib Guilbeau; except where indicated

 "If Something Should Come Between Us (Let It Be Love)" 
 "Louisiana" 
 "I'm Drinkin' Canada Dry" (Johnny Cymbal, Austin Roberts)
 "When You're Giving Yourself to a Stranger" 
 "What's One More Time" (Richard Leigh)
 "Run to the Night" 
 "How'd We Ever Get This Way" 
 "Coast to Coast" (John Beland)
 "Closer to You" 
 "Save the Wild Life" (Curly Putman, Dave Kirby)

Personnel
The Burrito Brothers
 John Beland - vocals, guitar, dobro
 "Sneaky" Pete Kleinow - pedal steel guitar
 Gib Guilbeau - guitar, fiddle
with:
Ron Krasinski - drums
Alan Estes - percussion
John Hobbs - keyboards
Dennis Belfield - bass
Larry McNeely - banjo
Tom Scott - saxophone
Billy Thomas, Lynn Nilles - vocal harmony

References 

Sunset Sundown
Sunset Sundown
Curb Records albums